The velocity factor (VF), also called wave propagation speed or velocity of propagation (VoP or  of a transmission medium is the ratio of the speed at which a wavefront (of an electromagnetic signal, a radio signal, a light pulse in an optical fibre or a change of the electrical voltage on a copper wire) passes through the medium, to the speed of light in vacuum. For optical signals, the velocity factor is the reciprocal of the refractive index.

The speed of radio signals in vacuum, for example, is the speed of light, and so the velocity factor of a radio wave in vacuum is 1.0 (unity). In electrical cables, the velocity factor mainly depends on the insulating material (see table below).

The use of the terms velocity of propagation and wave propagation speed to mean a ratio of speeds is confined to the computer networking and cable industries. In a general science and engineering context, these terms would be understood to mean a true speed or velocity in units of distance per time,<ref>"velocity of propagation" in Walker, P.M.B., Chambers Science and Technology Dictionary, Edinburgh, 1991, </ref> while velocity factor'' is used for the ratio.

Typical velocity factors 
Velocity factor is an important characteristic of communication media such as category 5 cables and radio transmission lines. Plenum data cable typically has a VF between 0.42 and 0.72 (42% to 72% of the speed of light in vacuum) and riser cable around 0.70 (approximately 210,000,000 m/s or 4.76 ns per metre).

Some typical velocity factors for radio communications cables provided in handbooks and texts are given in the following table:

Calculating velocity factor

Electric wave

in the usual case where the relative permeability, is 1. In the most general case:

which includes unusual magnetic conducting materials, such as ferrite.

The velocity factor for a lossless transmission line is given by:

Optical wave
VF equals the reciprocal of the refractive index  of the medium, usually optical fiber.

See also

 Coaxial cable
 Propagation delay
 Signal velocity
 Speed of electricity
 Speed of sound
 Telegrapher's equations

References

Electromagnetic radiation